Desná  is a river situated in Olomouc region of Czech Republic, left tributary of the Morava. It is 43.4 km long, and its basin area is 338 km2.

Character
The Desná river originates at the confluence of Hučivá Desná and Divoká Desná in Kouty nad Desnou, the village situated in deep valley of High Ash Mountains.
The Desná then goes southwest through a valley toward the town of Šumperk.
After approximately 43.4 km, the Desná flows into the Morava river near Postřelmov village. The mean annual discharge at its mouth is 4.48 m³/s
About 50% of the river is situated in urban area of Kouty nad Desnou, Loučná nad Desnou, Velké Losiny, Petrov nad Desnou, Rapotín, Vikýřovice, Šumperk and Sudkov, this parts of the river are strongly regulated. Riverbanks are often strengthened by walls; river stream is free of obstacles.
Natural character has been preserved in a part between Bludov and Sudkov, where the river has meander character. Meanders are inhabited by brown trouts, graylings, european bullheads and eurasian beavers.
Vegetation consists of stinging nettle, black alder, common hop, himalayan balsam, common knotweed, common knotgrass and giant hogweed.

Ponds 
The Desná feeds two major ponds.

Benátky

Benátky pond (literally: Venice), situated in Šumperk, is used for fishing, recreation and as a source of water for local swimming pool. Its area is 1,7ha.

Sudkovský rybník

Area of the Sudkovský rybník, which is situated in Sudkov, is 8 ha. First mention of the pond comes from 1480, when it was bought by The House of Tunkl who enlarged the pond and used them for fishery.  In 1867, the pond was bought by Ignác Seidl, the entrepreneur from Šumperk, who used it as a source of water for his nearby flax mill. After flax mill bankruptcy in 1990’s the pond is solely used for fishing.

1997 floods 

Devastating flood struck the basin of Desná in 1997. Railway situated along the river was totally destroyed and its state-owned operator decided to cancel whole rail line.  This was met with resistance of local citizens and the railway was bought and reconstructed by local municipalities, which grouped themselves into “Svazek obcí údolí Desné” (The Union of Municipalities from the Valley of Desná). Recently, the rail line is operated by private carrier.

Headwater creeks

Hučivá Desná
Hučivá Desná (literally Humming Desná) originates in a locality called Japonská Zahrada, 1275 meters above sea level. The length is 7 kilometers and mouth is situated 550 meters above sea level - the stream is very steep. It makes one of the most valuable parts of The High Ash Mountains Protected Landscape Area.
	Lower reaches, flowing through the village of Kouty nad Desnou, is regulated and banks are strengthened by stone walls.

In 1921, the locality of Hučivá Desná was hit by torrential rain. Mud from a slope of Červené hora peak with an area of 16 ha, flowed into the valley of Hučivá Desná.
About 50 000 m3 of mud created a dam. The dam later ruptured and enormous amount of water devastated whole Desná valley. As a result, a construction of man-made dam as a protection against floods was debated. However, this plan has not been realized and is not discussed at all now.

Divoká Desná

Divoká Desná (literally Wild Desná) originates from a north slope of Kamzičník peak, 1310 meters above sea level. The length is 12 kilometers and the mean annual discharge at its mouth is 1.5 m³/s.
Pumped storage plant is situated on the creek. A dam called Dlouhé stráně – dolní (literally Long Hillsides – lower) was constructed. The lake has a volume of 3 405 000 m3 and occupies area of 11,2 hectares. Water from the lake is pumped to the Dlouhé stráně –horní (literally Long Hillsides – upper), situated on the top of Dlouhé stráně peak, 1350 meters above sea level.

Whitewater kayaking or canoeingis practiced in a part below the dam.

References

External links 
 

Rivers of the Olomouc Region
Šumperk District